Harry Potter and the Chamber of Secrets (Original Motion Picture Soundtrack) is the film score to the 2002 film of the same name, composed by John Williams and conducted by William Ross. The score was originally supposed to be entirely conducted by Williams, but due to scheduling conflicts with the scoring of Steven Spielberg's film Catch Me If You Can, Ross was brought in to adapt Williams' material from Philosopher's Stone and conduct the scoring sessions with the London Symphony Orchestra with orchestrations provided by Conrad Pope, Eddie Karam and Pete Anthony.

Upon its release, the soundtrack was available in one of five different collectible covers. Each cover featured a different character or characters packaged above the main cover featuring Harry, Ron, and Hermione.

The soundtrack was released on 12 November 2002, and was a Grammy Award nominee for the Best Score Soundtrack for Visual Media in 2003. It charted on the Billboard 200 at 81 and also charted at 5 on the Top Soundtracks Chart. In Japan, the album was certified gold by the RIAJ for 100,000 copies shipped to stores. In 2018, La-La-Land Records released a complete version of the score in a two-disc CD as part of a three soundtrack set featuring the scores for the first three Harry Potter films.

Track listing

Original Release

Harry Potter - The John Williams Soundtrack Collection: Disc 4

Harry Potter - The John Williams Soundtrack Collection: Disc 5

References

02
London Symphony Orchestra soundtracks
Harry Potter 2
2002 soundtrack albums
2000s film soundtrack albums
Nonesuch Records soundtracks
Atlantic Records soundtracks
Warner Records soundtracks
La-La Land Records soundtracks
Fantasy film soundtracks